The Prix Idola Saint-Jean is a prize awarded by the Fédération des femmes du Québec to recognize a woman or group of women who have made a significant contribution to improve conditions for women and to advance feminism in Quebec. It was first awarded in 1991.

The prize was named in honour of Idola Saint-Jean, who helped gain the right to vote for women in Quebec.

Prize recipients 
1991 - Collective Par et Pour Elle inc. de Cowansville
1992 - Simonne Monet-Chartrand
1993 - Madeleine Parent
1994 - Nicole Dorin
1995 - Participants in the Du Pain et des Roses walk
1996 - Regroupement provincial des maisons d'hébergement et de transition pour femmes victimes de violence conjugale
1997 - Madeleine Lévesque et Shree Mulay
1998 - Centre de femmes L'Éclaircie de la Montérégie
1999 - Ruth Rose
2000 - Collectif des femmes immigrantes
2001 - Vivian Labrie
2002 - Centre d'éducation et d'action des femmes (CÉAF)
2003 - Éditions du remue-ménage
2006 - Ana-Maria Seghezzo D’Urbano
2007 - Intersyndicale des femmes with special mention of : L’autre Parole and la Table régionale des groupes de femmes Gaspésie–Îles-de-la-Madeleine
2008 - Gisèle Bourret and Nicole Boily
2009 -  Regroupement des centres de femmes du Québec
2010 - Léonie Couture and France Cormier
2011 - Regroupement des femmes de la Côte-de-Gaspé
2012 - Micheline Dumont

References 

Quebec awards
Women in Quebec
Feminism in Canada